Federal Medical Centre, Azare is a medical centre owned by the Federal Government of Nigeria. It is located along Amb. Ahmed Abdullah Road in Azare, Katagum, Bauchi State, Nigeria. The center was opened to commence operation in 2001. The federal Medical centre Azare is an agency under the federal ministry of health. It mark it 20  year anniversary march 17, 2022.

Accreditation
Federal Medical Center was accredited by WACS and NOUN.

References

Hospitals in Nigeria
Buildings and structures in Bauchi State